The solarball is a water purification device based on evaporation purification. It consists of a clear plastic sphere which users would fill with water and then wear on their heads. A solarball can produce three liters of clean water per day.

Sunlight enters inside of the ball passing through transparent layer and evaporates dirty water, in the other side of the ball, water vapours condense and form clean water. It was invented by Jonathan Liow (約翰·廖中萊), an Australian student who is studying Industrial Design.

References

External links
 How Do I Use Solar Power to Purify Water?

Water treatment